

N06A Antidepressants

N06AA Non-selective monoamine reuptake inhibitors
N06AA01 Desipramine
N06AA02 Imipramine
N06AA03 Imipramine oxide
N06AA04 Clomipramine
N06AA05 Opipramol
N06AA06 Trimipramine
N06AA07 Lofepramine
N06AA08 Dibenzepin
N06AA09 Amitriptyline
N06AA10 Nortriptyline
N06AA11 Protriptyline
N06AA12 Doxepin
N06AA13 Iprindole
N06AA14 Melitracen
N06AA15 Butriptyline
N06AA16 Dosulepin
N06AA17 Amoxapine
N06AA18 Dimetacrine
N06AA19 Amineptine
N06AA21 Maprotiline
N06AA23 Quinupramine

N06AB Selective serotonin reuptake inhibitors
N06AB02 Zimelidine
N06AB03 Fluoxetine
N06AB04 Citalopram
N06AB05 Paroxetine
N06AB06 Sertraline
N06AB07 Alaproclate
N06AB08 Fluvoxamine
N06AB09 Etoperidone
N06AB10 Escitalopram

N06AF Monoamine oxidase inhibitors, non-selective
N06AF01 Isocarboxazid
N06AF02 Nialamide
N06AF03 Phenelzine
N06AF04 Tranylcypromine
N06AF05 Iproniazide
N06AF06 Iproclozide

N06AG Monoamine oxidase A inhibitors
N06AG02 Moclobemide
N06AG03 Toloxatone

N06AX Other antidepressants
N06AX01 Oxitriptan
N06AX02 Tryptophan
N06AX03 Mianserin
N06AX04 Nomifensine
N06AX05 Trazodone
N06AX06 Nefazodone
N06AX07 Minaprine
N06AX08 Bifemelane
N06AX09 Viloxazine
N06AX10 Oxaflozane
N06AX11 Mirtazapine
N06AX12 Bupropion
N06AX13 Medifoxamine
N06AX14 Tianeptine
N06AX15 Pivagabine
N06AX16 Venlafaxine
N06AX17 Milnacipran
N06AX18 Reboxetine
N06AX19 Gepirone
N06AX21 Duloxetine
N06AX22 Agomelatine
N06AX23 Desvenlafaxine
N06AX24 Vilazodone
N06AX25 Hyperici herba
N06AX26 Vortioxetine
N06AX27 Esketamine
N06AX28 Levomilnacipran
N06AX29 Brexanolone
QN06AX90 Selegiline

N06B Psychostimulants, agents used for ADHD and nootropics

N06BA Centrally acting sympathomimetics
N06BA01 Amphetamine
N06BA02 Dexamphetamine
N06BA03 Dextromethamphetamine
N06BA04 Methylphenidate
N06BA05 Pemoline
N06BA06 Fencamfamin
N06BA07 Modafinil
N06BA08 Fenozolone
N06BA09 Atomoxetine
N06BA10 Fenetylline
N06BA11 Dexmethylphenidate
N06BA12 Lisdexamfetamine
N06BA13 Armodafinil
N06BA14 Solriamfetol
N06BA15 Dexmethylphenidate and serdexmethylphenidate

N06BC Xanthine derivatives
N06BC01 Caffeine
N06BC02 Propentofylline

N06BX Other psychostimulants and nootropics
N06BX01 Meclofenoxate
N06BX02 Pyritinol
N06BX03 Piracetam
N06BX04 Deanol
N06BX05 Fipexide
N06BX06 Citicoline
N06BX07 Oxiracetam
N06BX08 Pirisudanol
N06BX09 Linopirdine
N06BX10 Nizofenone
N06BX11 Aniracetam
N06BX12 Acetylcarnitine
N06BX13 Idebenone
N06BX14 Prolintane
N06BX15 Pipradrol
N06BX16 Pramiracetam
N06BX17 Adrafinil
N06BX18 Vinpocetine
N06BX21 Temgicoluril
N06BX22 Phenibut

N06C Psycholeptics and psychoanaleptics in combination

N06CA Antidepressants in combination with psycholeptics
N06CA01 Amitriptyline and psycholeptics
N06CA02 Melitracen and psycholeptics
N06CA03 Fluoxetine and psycholeptics

N06CB Psychostimulants in combination with psycholeptics

N06D Anti-dementia drugs

N06DA Anticholinesterases
N06DA01 Tacrine
N06DA02 Donepezil
N06DA03 Rivastigmine
N06DA04 Galantamine
N06DA05 Ipidacrine
N06DA52 Donepezil and memantine
N06DA53 Donepezil, memantine and Ginkgo folium

N06DX Other anti-dementia drugs
N06DX01 Memantine
N06DX02 Ginkgo folium
N06DX03 Aducanumab
N06DX30 Combinations

References

N06